The 1903 VPI football team represented Virginia Agricultural and Mechanical College and Polytechnic Institute in the 1903 college football season. The team was led by head coach Charles Augustus Lueder and finished with a record of five wins and one loss (5–1).

Schedule

Game summaries

Virginia
The starting lineup for VPI was: Robins (left end), Willson (left tackle), Walsh (left guard), Stiles (center), Abbott (right guard), Miles (right tackle), Lewis (right end), Bear (quarterback), Byrd (left halfback), Hodgson (right halfback), Counselman (fullback). The substitute was Schaefer.

North Carolina
The starting lineup for VPI was: Robins (left end), Willson (left tackle), Walsh (left guard), Stiles (center), Abbott (right guard), Miles (right tackle), Lewis (right end), Bear (quarterback), Byrd (left halfback), Carpenter (right halfback), Counselman (fullback). The substitute was Hodgson.

Navy
The starting lineup for VPI was: Robins (left end), Willson (left tackle), Walsh (left guard), Stiles (center), Abbott (right guard), Miles (right tackle), Lewis (right end), Bear (quarterback), Byrd (left halfback), Carpenter (right halfback), Counselman (fullback).

Players
The following players were members of the 1903 football team according to the roster published in the 1904 edition of The Bugle, the Virginia Tech yearbook.

References

VPI
Virginia Tech Hokies football seasons
VPI football